William Kent Ingram, was an Arkansas senator from 1963 to 1981. He died in office and was succeeded by his son, W. Kent Ingram.

References

1910 births
1981 deaths
Arkansas state senators
20th-century American politicians